L'Algérie Libre (meaning Free Algeria in English) was a French-language newspaper based in Algiers, Algeria.

Overview
L'Algerie libre, whose acronym was "By the people and for the people" was founded by Mohamed Khider on 2 November 1949 and ceased to appear on 5 November 1954.

This illustrated publication was printed in the city of Paris within France and was a partisan bimonthly journal specializing in general information.

It is the independence party Algerian People's Party (PPA) the Movement for the Triumph of Democratic Liberties (MTLD) which oversaw this review which was printed for 128 issues before its shutdown the day after the outbreak of the Algerian Revolution.

See also

 Algerian People's Party
 Movement for the Triumph of Democratic Liberties
 Mohamed Khider
 Mohamed Aïchaoui
 List of newspapers in Algeria

Bibliography

References

External links

1949 establishments in Algeria
Bi-monthly magazines published in France
French-language newspapers published in Algeria
Mass media in Algiers
Newspapers established in 1949
Publications disestablished in 1954
Magazines published in Paris